Neso can refer to:
Neso, one of the Nereids
Neso, daughter of King Teucer
Neso (moon), the outermost moon of Neptune, and the moon with the greatest known orbital distance from its planet
Neso Academy, e-learning website